Synaphea recurva is a shrub endemic to Western Australia.

It blooms between July and September producing yellow flowers.

It is found along the west coast on flats and rises in the Mid West region of Western Australia between Geraldton and Northampton where it grows in gravelly-loamy soils over sandstone or granite.

References

Eudicots of Western Australia
recurva
Endemic flora of Western Australia
Plants described in 1995